Ruth Sophia Spelmeyer (born 19 September 1990) is a German sprinter. She competed in the 4 × 400 metres relay at the 2016 European Athletics Championships. At the 2016 Summer Olympics, she competed in the women's 400 metre event and the women's 4 x 400 metre relay.

References

External links
 

1990 births
Living people
German female sprinters
Place of birth missing (living people)
Athletes (track and field) at the 2016 Summer Olympics
Athletes (track and field) at the 2020 Summer Olympics
Olympic athletes of Germany
Sportspeople from Göttingen
Olympic female sprinters